David Dorfman (born 1993) is an American attorney and retired actor.

David Dorfman may also refer to:

 David Dorfman (choreographer) (born 1955), an American dancer, choreographer, musician, activist and teacher
 David S. Dorfman, an American screenwriter

See also
 Dave Dorman (born 1958), American illustrator
 David Dorman (born 1954), American telecommunications chief executive